Dr. Domingo Alaba John Obende (born 5 December 1954) is a businessman, a graduate of Yaba Trade Centre, University of Benin and University of East London Business School, holder of Bsc Public Admin, MBA Public Service and was elected Senator for Edo North Senatorial District, in Edo State, Nigeria, in the 9 April 2011 elections. He ran on the Action Congress of Nigeria platform now All Progressives Congress (APC) platform. He was a member of the 7th Senate (2011-2015).

Background
Domingo Alaba Obende was born in Igarra in the Akoko-Edo Local Government Area of Edo State, Nigeria on 5 December 1954. 
He obtained a Bachelor of Public Administration degree from the University of Benin, MBA in Public Services from the UEL Business School, University of East London in the United Kingdom.
Official positions include an appointment as Justice of the peace by the Edo state government, Chairman of the Nigeria-Serbia Chamber of Commerce and President of the Institute of Corporate Affairs Management Nigeria.
Obende was appointed chairman of the Board of Directors of the Edo State Urban Water Board, and became Executive Chairman of a number of companies in Nigeria and the United Kingdom.

Political career
In the 2007 elections, Obende competed unsuccessfully in the PDP primary for Edo North Senate seat. He later became the  Vice Chairman of PDP,  Edo North Senatorial District.
He was a member of the PDP National Electoral Panel representing Edo State at the 2008 PDP Congress.
In the 9 April 2011 elections, Obende ran on the ACN platform. He ran against Alhaji Yisa Braimoh and defeated him to emerge Senator for Edo North Senatorial District.  Yisa Braimoh, during the campaign accused Obende of producing numerous false certificates. He took Obende to several courts and at the end of the day the cases were dismissed in favour of Senator Domingo Alaba Obende. At the High Court in Abuja he was asked to pay 100,000.00 naira only as charge in favour of Senator Obende for which he challenged also at the Court of Appeal but in delivering judgment at the Court of Appeal, he was equally asked to pay 30,000.00 only.

Obende said that he opposes President Goodluck Jonathan's proposal for a single-term six-year tenure. Of this, he says: "A governor comes for six years; he loots the whole treasury and goes away. Putting them in jail will not solve the problem. What will solve the problem and fix this country is for every governor and every head of state to develop their various states and Nigeria by implication. So, I do not buy that idea and I don’t think this bill will fly."

References

Living people
Members of the Senate (Nigeria)
People from Edo State
1954 births
University of Benin (Nigeria) alumni
Alumni of the University of East London